Oreophryne waira is a species of frog in the family Microhylidae.
It is endemic to West Papua, Indonesia.
Its natural habitats are subtropical or tropical moist lowland forests and subtropical or tropical moist montane forests.
It is threatened by habitat loss.

References

waira
Amphibians of Western New Guinea
Taxonomy articles created by Polbot
Amphibians described in 2003